The race of Cleopatra VII, the last active Hellenistic ruler of the Macedonian-led Ptolemaic Kingdom of Egypt, has caused some debate in some circles. Scholars have concluded that she was largely of Macedonian Greek ancestry (with some Persian), but others have wondered whether she had additional ancestries.

For example, the article "Was Cleopatra Black?" was published in Ebony magazine in 2002. Mary Lefkowitz, Professor Emerita of Classical Studies at Wellesley College, traces the main origins of the Black Cleopatra claim to the 1946 book by J. A. Rogers called "World's Great Men of Color", although noting that the idea of Cleopatra as black goes back to at least the 19th century. Lefkowitz refutes Rogers' hypothesis, on various scholarly grounds. The black Cleopatra claim was further revived in an essay by afrocentrist John Henrik Clarke, chair of African history at Hunter College, entitled "African Warrior Queens." Lefkowitz notes the essay includes the claim that Cleopatra described herself as black in the New Testament's Book of Acts – when in fact Cleopatra had died more than sixty years before the death of Jesus Christ.

Scholars identify Cleopatra as having been essentially of Greek ancestry with some Persian and Sogdian Iranian ancestry, based on the fact that her Macedonian Greek family (the Ptolemaic dynasty) had intermarried with the Seleucid dynasty. Michael Grant states that Cleopatra probably had not a drop of Egyptian blood and that she "would have described herself as Greek." Duane W. Roller notes that "there is absolutely no evidence" that Cleopatra was racially black African as claimed by what he dismisses as generally not "credible scholarly sources."

Cleopatra's official coinage (which she would have approved) and the three portrait busts of her considered authentic by scholars (which match her coins) portray Cleopatra as a Greek woman in style. Polo writes that Cleopatra's coinage presents her image with certainty and asserts that the sculpted portrait of the "Berlin Cleopatra" head is confirmed as having a similar profile. Roman frescoes in Pompeii and Herculaneum similar to the Vatican and Berlin marble sculptures have been identified as possible portraits of the queen based on comparable facial features and royal iconography.

In 2009, a BBC documentary speculated that Cleopatra might have been part North African. This was based largely on the examination of a headless skeleton of a female child in a 20 BCE tomb in Ephesus (modern Turkey), together with the old notes and photographs of the now-missing skull. The remains were hypothesized to be those of Arsinoe IV, half-sister to Cleopatra, and conjecture based on discredited processes suggested that the remains belonged to a girl whose "race" may have been "North African". This claim is rejected by scholars, based on the remains being impossible to identify as Arsinoe, the race of the remains being impossible to identify at all, the fact that the remains belonged to a child much younger than Arsinoe when she died, and the fact that Arsinoe and Cleopatra shared the same father, Ptolemy XII Auletes, but may have had different mothers.

Background 

The race and skin color of Cleopatra VII, the last active Hellenistic ruler of the Macedonian Greek Ptolemaic dynasty of Egypt, has caused some debate, although generally not in scholarly sources. For example, the article "Was Cleopatra Black?" was published in Ebony magazine in 2002, and an article about Afrocentrism from the St. Louis Post-Dispatch mentions the question, too.

Mary Lefkowitz, Professor Emerita of Classical Studies at Wellesley College, traces the main origins of the black Cleopatra claim to the 1946 book by J.A. Rogers called World's Great Men of Color, although noting that the idea of Cleopatra as black goes back to at least the 19th century. Lefkowitz refutes Rogers' hypothesis. She notes Rogers's inability to correctly number Cleopatra's family (for example, naming Cleopatra's brother Ptolemy XIII Theos Philopator as her father, who was Ptolemy XII Auletes, and naming Ptolemy XI Alexander II as Ptolemy XII's father when he was  Ptolemy IX Soter), using as his main sources a misinterpretation of William Shakespeare's Antony and Cleopatra (written over 1,500 years after Cleopatra's death) and falsely citing Encyclopedia Britannica (when in fact it did not then or ever claim Cleopatra was black), and that his presumption Cleopatra's paternal grandmother was a black African slave is "based in the more recent past."

She further stresses slavery in ancient times was very different from modern black chattel slavery, as slaves were not taken based on skin color but were in actuality mostly war captives, largely including Greeks, and notes Roger's claim of a black grandmother is based on practices by slave owners of the 19th century. The black Cleopatra claim, Lefkowitz continues, was further revived in an essay written by afrocentrist John Henrik Clarke, chair of African history at Hunter College, entitled "African Warrior Queens" for "Black Women in Antiquity."

She notes the essay was largely drawn on the writings of Rogers with Clarke's added "supporting information of his own" that includes his claim Cleopatra described herself as black in the New Testament's Book of Acts – when in fact Cleopatra had died more than sixty years before the death of Jesus. She also notes that if Cleopatra's paternal grandmother was Egyptian and that is how she learned Egyptian, it would be more likely for Cleopatra's father Ptolemy XII to be the first Ptolemy to learn Egyptian instead of Cleopatra (noting those like Rogers and Clarke never mention him), who is the only member of the Ptolemaic dynasty known to have learned Egyptian in addition to her native tongue Koine Greek and eight other languages.

In her 1993 paper "Black Feminist Thought and Classics: Re-Membering, Re-Claiming, Re-Empowering," classicist Shelley P. Haley discusses Cleopatra from a Black feminist perspective in which she sees the queen as a symbolic figure for African-American women. She writes that "Cleopatra reacted to the phenomena of oppression and exploitation as a Black woman would."  Thus, African-American audiences claim Cleopatra as a 'sister.' When prompted on Lefkowitz's criticism of her 1993 article, Haley further argued in favor of Cleopatra symbolizing for African-American women "the treatment we have received at the hands of Eurocentric patriarchy." In regards to the question of the race of the historical Cleopatra, Haley responded "that this is a very complex question when one can ask it about Cleopatra or any ancient—or modern—historical figure." In addition to being a symbolic figure in American Black feminism, Cleopatra became an icon for Egyptian audiences over centuries as well as in the modern age for the Arab and Egyptian nationalist movements. As a national icon for Egyptians, Cleopatra has been seen by such figures as Ahmed Shawqi as representative of the conflict between Egypt and imperialist European powers. (As pointed out by historian Adrian Goldsworthy, however, if there had been any 'great struggle' of civilizations in the historical Cleopatra VII's lifetime, it was "not between east and west, but Greek and Roman".)

In response to the book Not Out of Africa by Lefkowitz, Molefi Kete Asante, Professor of African American Studies at Temple University wrote the article "Race in Antiquity: Truly Out of Africa", in which he emphasized that he "can say without a doubt that Afrocentrists do not spend time arguing that either Socrates or Cleopatra were black."

More recently Kathryn Bard, Professor of Archaeology and Classical Studies at Boston University stated in 2020 that: "Cleopatra was white of Macedonian descent, as were all of the Ptolemy rulers, who lived in Egypt," while for Rebecca Futo Kennedy, Associate Professor of Classics, Women's and Gender Studies, and Environmental Studies at Denison University, since there is no genetic basis for race, any claims to being able to identify Cleopatra's "true racial background" from her family tree perpetuate nothing else but a modern political position. For Dame Mary Beard, Professor of Classics at the University of Cambridge and scholar of Ancient Roman civilisation, "The truth is that we have no idea of the origins of Cleopatra. She was certainly of a royal Macedonian family, but whether her mother (or any other of her female ancestors) was Egyptian we just don't know."

In regards to the debate surrounding the casting in 2020 of Israeli actress Gal Gadot in a Cleopatra film project, Egyptian-Australian writer and journalist Daniel Nour contended Egyptians should have a say who is cast as Cleopatra, as she was a "queen of Egyptian history." In the context of Egyptian feminism, Nour argues that for Egyptian women "the choice to cast an Egyptian woman in a role like Cleopatra can be incredibly empowering." He continues that since Cleopatra is an Egyptian queen of Greek ancestry, she is representative of the genetic diversity of modern Egypt. He further notes the importance of Egyptian feminist Nawal El Saadawi's identifying Cleopatra's role in Egyptian history as part of "historical demonstrations of the matriarchal power structures held by North-African women." The exclusion of Cleopatra's Greek-ness from mainstream Hollywood productions has also been recently discussed by Greek scholars: Greek historian Konstantinos P. Nikoloutsos, in his anthology Ancient Greek Women in Film (2013), includes a chapter written by the classicist Lloyd Llewellyn-Jones entitled "‘An Almost All Greek Thing’: Cleopatra VII and Hollywood Imagination" (a reference to the famous 1963 film Cleopatra) which critiques the lack of representation of Greek culture in portrayals of Cleopatra.

Known depictions 

Cleopatra's official Ptolemaic coinage (which she would have approved) and the three Roman portrait busts of her considered authentic by scholars (which match her coins) portray Cleopatra as a Greek woman in style, including the Greek chiton, Hellenistic diadem, and Greek chignon. Francisco Pina Polo writes that Cleopatra's coinage present her image with certainty and asserts that the sculpted portrait of the "Berlin Cleopatra" head from the Altes Museum is confirmed as having a similar profile with her hair pulled back into a bun, a diadem, and a hooked nose. Ernle Bradford writes that it is "reasonable to infer" Cleopatra had dark hair and "pale olive skin" by how she portrays herself as a "Eastern Mediterranean type" on her official coins, and that she challenged Rome not as an Egyptian woman, "but as a civilized Greek." Barbara Watterson notes that Cleopatra's coins show her in the Greek style rather than the Egyptian style and argues that although she was a Macedonian Greek we can only speculate the color of Cleopatra's features, but probably had dark brown hair and eyes and skin with an olive hue.

Similar to the Berlin Cleopatra, other Roman sculpted portraits of Cleopatra include diadem-wearing marble heads now located in the Vatican Museums and Archaeological Museum of Cherchell, although the latter may instead be a depiction of her daughter Cleopatra Selene II. The diademed 'Esquiline Venus' statue in the Capitoline Museums is also speculated as being an additional depiction of the queen, especially due to her connection with the Greek goddess Aphrodite as seen on some of her coinage. The Portland Vase, a Roman cameo glass vase dated to the reign of Augustus and now in the British Museum, includes a possible depiction of Cleopatra with a serpent rising in her lap as she sits and grasps the arm of her Roman spouse Mark Antony.

In addition to sculptures and coins, several surviving Roman frescoes from Pompeii and Herculaneum also likely depict Cleopatra. A contemporaneous depiction from Pompeii's House of Marcus Fabius Rufus depicts the queen as the goddess Venus Genetrix holding a cupid in her arms, ostensibly a rare depiction of her son Caesarion who was fathered by the Roman dictator Julius Caesar. Susan Walker notes that the woman's ivory-white skin, round face, long aquiline nose, and large round eyes were features common in Roman and Ptolemaic depictions of goddesses.

Duane W. Roller writes about the fresco: "there seems little doubt that this is a depiction of Cleopatra and Caesarion before the doors of the Temple of Venus in the Forum Julium and, as such, it becomes the only extant contemporary painting of the queen." Walker, Roller and Joann Fletcher observe the similarity of this Pompeiian painting with the face preserved in the "Vatican Cleopatra", the damage on the left cheek of the sculpture possibly from the arm of a cupid that may have been torn off.

Posthumous portraits include a fresco of Pompeii's House of Giuseppe II depicting her possible suicide by poisoning, a painted portrait in Pompeii's House of the Orchard showing a side view of her diademed bust, and a highly similar fresco from nearby Herculaneum, the latter which matches the visage of her sculptures and official coinage.

Aside from Hellenistic art, native Egyptian artworks of Cleopatra include the Bust of Cleopatra in the Royal Ontario Museum, as well as stone-carved reliefs of the Temple of Hathor in the Dendera Temple complex in Egypt depicting Cleopatra and Caesarion as ruling pharaohs providing offerings to Egyptian deities. Other works include a large Ptolemaic black basalt statue now in the Hermitage Museum, Saint Petersburg, depicting an uncertain Ptolemaic queen thought to be either Arsinoe II or the famous Cleopatra VII.

In his  (2006),  contends that this Egyptian basalt statue is like other idealized Egyptian portraits of the queen, and does not contain realistic facial features and hence adds little to the knowledge of Cleopatra's appearance. Diana Preston comes to a similar conclusion about native Egyptian depictions of Cleopatra: "Apart from certain temple carvings, which are anyway in a highly stylised pharaonic style and give little clue to Cleopatra's real appearance, the only certain representations of Cleopatra are those on coins. The marble head in the Vatican is one of three sculptures generally, though not universally, accepted by scholars to be depictions of Cleopatra." Barabara Watterson writes that the depictions of Cleopatra such as at Hathor are conventional Egyptian representations rather than actual portraits of the queen. She notes that the Dendera relief shows Cleopatra in the "typical Ptolemaic style."

Ancestry 
Scholars generally identify Cleopatra as essentially of Greek ancestry with some Persian and Sogdian Iranian ancestry. This is based on the fact that her Macedonian Greek family – the Ptolemaic dynasty – had intermarried with the Seleucid dynasty that ruled over much of West Asia. Notably this included the first Ptolemaic Cleopatra, Queen Cleopatra I Syra, a Seleucid princess and daughter of Antiochus III the Great who married Ptolemy V Epiphanes. Cleopatra I Syra was a descendant of the Seleucid Queen Apama, the Sogdian Iranian wife of Seleucus I Nicator, a Macedonian Greek companion of Alexander the Great. Laodice III, the mother of Cleopatra I Syra, was born to king Mithridates II of Pontus and his wife Laodice, who had a mixed Greek and Persian ancestral heritage.

While the identity of Cleopatra VII Philopator's mother is uncertain, she is generally believed to be Cleopatra V of Egypt, the sister or cousin wife of Ptolemy XII Auletes, who was the daughter of Ptolemy IX Soter or Ptolemy X Alexander I. Additionally, while the identity of her paternal grandmother is not certain, she is generally believed to be Cleopatra IV, via Ptolemy XII's father, Ptolemy IX Soter, or a Greek Alexandrian woman. Claims of illegitimacy were never used against Cleopatra in the extremely hostile propaganda campaign by Augustus, Michael Grant noting that if Cleopatra had been illegitimate, her "numerous Roman enemies would have revealed this to the world."

Grant states that Cleopatra probably had not a drop of Egyptian blood and that she "would have described herself as Greek." Grant also proposes that Cleopatra's paternal grandmother may have been mixed Syrian and Greek, in line with the precedent of Persian and Syrian blood in the Ptolemaic line, and continues that "certainly she was not an Egyptian," noting there is no known Egyptian wife of a Ptolemaic king and there is only one known Egyptian mistress of a Ptolemy (from the 3rd century BCE). Lefkowitz writes that this Egyptian woman, named Didyame, was the mistress of Ptolemy II Philadelphus. She notes that among Ptolemy II's many mistresses, Didyame was specifically singled out because she was Egyptian, and not of the usual Greek stock among Ptolemaic mistresses (who included among Ptolemy II's mistresses, the courtesans Bilistiche, Agathocleia, Stratonice of Libya, and Myrto—whose coloring and ethnicity were not specifically pointed out like Didyame, "presumably because they were Greek"). She further notes that if she had any children by Ptolemy, they never became king (all Ptolemaic kings were regarded as fully legitimate save for Ptolemy XII Auletes). She contends that it is "misleading to suggest that the unique non-Greek mistress Didyame provides evidence of a common practice."

Duane W. Roller speculates that Cleopatra VII could have been the daughter of a hypothetical half-Macedonian-Greek, half-Egyptian woman belonging to the priestly family of Ptah (the other main candidate he notes would be Cleopatra V/VI) located in Memphis in northern Egypt, but contends that whatever Cleopatra's ancestry, she valued her Greek Ptolemaic heritage the most. He further notes that "there is absolutely no evidence" that Cleopatra was racially black African as claimed by what he dismisses as generally not "credible scholarly sources." He goes onto say outside the hypothesis of Cleopatra being three-quarters Macedonian Greek and a quarter Egyptian, there is "no room for anything else, certainly not for any black African blood." Diana Preston also writes that Cleopatra's paternal grandmother may have been part Syrian, continuing that even if Cleopatra had an Egyptian grandmother "it does not follow she was a black African" and that Cleopatra "almost certainly had olive skin and dark eyes."

Adrian Goldsworthy notes Cleopatra, having Macedonian blood with a little Syrian, was probably not dark skinned (he also notes Roman propaganda never mentions it), contending "fairer skin is marginally more likely considering her ancestry," and that she "was no more Egyptian culturally or ethnically than most residents of modern day Arizona are Apaches."

He further notes that Cleopatra's native tongue was Greek, that it was in "Greek literature and culture she that was educated," that her worship of Isis was "strongly Hellenised," and that although she was presented in some statuary in the idealized Egyptian style, she was unlikely to have dressed like this outside of performing certain rites. Instead, he continues, Cleopatra "wore the headband and robes of a Greek monarch." Stacy Schiff concurs Cleopatra was not dark-skinned, that "the Ptolemies were in fact Macedonian Greek, which makes Cleopatra approximately as Egyptian as Elizabeth Taylor", that her Ptolemaic relatives were described as "honey skinned", that she was part Persian, and that "an Egyptian mistress is a rarity among the Ptolemies."

Mary Lefkowitz notes that had Cleopatra's grandmother or mother been Egyptian, it surely would have been pointed out in the records, and concludes that whatever her ancestry, Cleopatra "regarded herself as Greek." Schiff continues that Cleopatra "faithfully held up the family tradition." In essence, Cleopatra's loyalties were to her Ptolemaic Greek heritage. As noted by Donald R. Dudley, Cleopatra and her family were "the successor[s] to the native Pharaohs, exploiting through a highly organized bureaucracy the great natural resources of the Nile Valley."

Arsinoe IV

In 2009, a BBC documentary speculated that Arsinoe IV of Egypt, the half-sister of Cleopatra VII, may have been part North African and then further speculated that Cleopatra's mother, thus Cleopatra herself, might also have been part North African. This was based largely on the claims of Hilke Thür of the Austrian Academy of Sciences, who in the 1990s had examined a headless skeleton of a female child in a 20 BCE tomb in Ephesus (modern Turkey), together with the old notes and photographs of the now-missing skull. She hypothesized the body as that of Arsinoe.

Arsinoe and Cleopatra shared the same father (Ptolemy XII Auletes) but had different mothers, with Thür claiming the alleged African ancestry came from the skeleton's mother. However, researchers Clarence C. Gravlee, H. Russell Bernard, and William R. Leonard, and others have demonstrated that skull measurements are not a reliable indicator of race and the measurements were jotted down in 1920 before modern forensic science took hold.

To date it has never been definitively proved the skeleton is that of Arsinoe IV. Furthermore, craniometry as used by Thür to determine race is based in scientific racism that is now generally considered a pseudoscience that supported "exploitation of groups of people" to "perpetuate racial oppression" and "distorted future views of the biological basis of race." When a DNA test was made that attempted to determine the identity of the child, it was impossible to get an accurate reading since the bones had been handled too many times, and the skull had been lost in Germany during World War II.

Mary Beard wrote a dissenting essay criticizing the findings, pointing out that one, there is no surviving name on the tomb and that the claim the tomb is alleged to invoke the shape of the Pharos Lighthouse "doesn't add up"; second, the skull did not survive intact and the skeleton is of a child too young to be that of Arsinoe (the bones are said to be that of a 15–18-year-old child, with Arsinoe being around her mid twenties at her death); and third, since Cleopatra and Arsinoe were not known to have the same mother, "the ethnic argument goes largely out of the window."

See also
 Afrocentrism
 Ancient Egyptian race controversy
 Biological anthropology
 Demographics of Egypt
 Early life of Cleopatra
 Egyptomania
 Ptolemaic dynasty
 Ptolemaic Kingdom

References

Sources

. 
 
Kathryn A. Bard: "Ancient Egyptians and the issue of Race", Bostonia Magazine, 1992: later part of Black Athena Revisited, 1996. 

 

Debbie Challis, 2013: The Archaeology of Race: The Eugenic Ideas of Francis Galton and Flinders Petrie, Bloomsbury Academic

Bruce R. Dain, 2002 A Hideous Monster Of The Mind: American race theory in the early republic, Harvard University Press

 
 
 

 

Shomarka Keita: "The Geographical Origins and Population Relationships of Early Ancient Egyptians", Egypt in Africa, (1996), pp. 25–27

. Reprinted with revisions as part of the essay collection Black Athena Revisited, 1996

Anthony Noguera, 1976. How African Was Egypt?: A Comparative Study of Ancient Egyptian and Black African Cultures. Illustrations by Joelle Noguera. New York: Vantage Press
.

"Ptolemaic Dynasty Affiliates". www.tyndalehouse.com. Archived from the original on 2011-07-16. Retrieved 2017-06-09
 

Yaacov Shavit, 2001: History in Black. African-Americans in Search of an Ancient Past, Frank Cass Publishers
Frank M. Snowden, Jr.: "Bernal's "Blacks" and the Afrocentrists", Black Athena Revisited, 1996
Scott Tafton, 2004: Egypt Land: Race and Nineteenth-Century American Egyptomania, Duke University Press
Joyce Tyldesley: Cleopatra, Last Queen of Egypt, Profile Books Ltd, 2008

Further reading
 
 
 
 

 
 
 . 
 
.

Cleopatra
Race (human categorization)
Pseudohistory
Ancient Egyptian race controversy